Leah Kramer is an American author, store owner and website founder.

She is the author of The Craftster Guide to Nifty, Thrifty, and Kitschy Crafts: Fifty Fabulous Projects from the Fifties and Sixties and the founder of Craftster, an online community for crafting and DIY enthusiasts.

Kramer is the co-founder and co-owner of Magpie, a brick and mortar store in Somerville, Massachusetts, which sells handmade goods and local art by crafters and artists.

Publications

References

External links
 Leah Kramer explains how you can be crafty on the cheap., from the web-only interview series, WGBH One Guest
 Leah Kramer interviewed about Craftster.org and crafting., from SFist.com
 Leah Kramer interviewed about Craftster.org and crafting., from austinist.com
 Leah Kramer interviewed about Craftster.org and the new rise in popularity of crafting amongst 20-somethings., from TIME Magazine

American non-fiction writers
Living people
Year of birth missing (living people)